The Balichak railway station in the Indian state of West Bengal, serves Balichak, India in Paschim Medinipur district. It is under the jurisdiction of South Eastern Railway zone. Balichak railway station is a medium railway station of Kharagpur railway division. It is on the Howrah–Kharagpur line.

History
Balichak railway station is situated in Balichak, Debra, West Bengal. Station code is BCK. It is a small railway station between Howrah and Kharagpur. Neighbourhood stations are Shyam Chak and Duan and near by major railway station is Kharagpur Jn. Local EMU trains Howrah–Balichak, Howrah–Kharagpur, Santragachi–Kharagpur local, Howrah–Kharagpur local, Howrah–Midnapore Local train stop here. The Howrah–Kharagpur line was opened in 1900. The Howrah–Kharagpur stretch has three lines. There is a plan to build a fourth line for the Santragachi–Panskura–Kharagpur stretch.
The Howrah–Kharagpur line was electrified in 1967–69.

References

External links
Trains at Balichak

Railway stations in Paschim Medinipur district
Kolkata Suburban Railway stations